Giannis Marditsis (19 February 1933 – 26 January 2010) was a Greek professional footballer who played as a defender and a later manager.

Early life
Marditsis was born on 13 February 1933 in the Kleidi, Boeotia. His father, Zisis, was killed in 1940 while serving the Greek military on the Albanian front, thus the 7-year-old Giannis, his mother Alexandra and his sisters Ourania and Konstantina were forced to move to Athens. They settled in Aigaleo and young Marditsis started playing the favorite sport of the children at the time, football.

Club career
Marditsis started playing for Artemis and in 1948, at the age of 16 he was transferred to Egaleo and became a member of the second team. In 1949 he was promoted to the first team, who participated in the second division of championship of Athens, playing as a striker. With the establishment of the first national division in June 1959, the then president of AEK Athens, Nikos Goumas, following a recommendation from the club's coach, Tryfon Tzanetis, gives the an unreal for the time amount of 103,000 drachmas and five footballers to sign Marditsis, thus beating Panathinaikos, who were also interested in the player.

He made his debut with the yellow-blacks on 23 September 1959 in a Cup match against Proodos Patisia, where AEK won with 4–0. Due to his tall body structure for the time, he was used as a center back by Tzanetis on 13 December 1959 in an away match against PAOK, replacing the injured Nikos Melissas with AEK winning by 1–2. Since then, he has established himself in this position, creating alongside Miltos Papapostolou an formitable duo in the club's defense. On 7 March 1961, the administration of the club banned him for one year because in the match for the league game against Panionios due to disrespectfull beheviour and insulting his teammates, while also making an attempt to leave the pitch. Eventually, on 21 March the administration took back their original decision. He played with AEK for 5 seasons, winning the championship in 1963 and a Greek Cup in 1964. His last appearance with the AEK was on 18 September 1963 in the away 7–2 defeat against Monaco for the qualifying phase of the European Cup. After AEK he continued his career at Korinthos, playing in the second division, until the summer of 1966 when he retired as a footballer.

International career
Marditsis was a key member of the Greek military team, with which he was capped 28 times and won the World Military Cup in 1962. He was also an international with the Greece U19.

Managerial career
After the end of his career as a football player Marditsis became involved in coaching, managing clubs such as Charavgiakos and Almyros.

Personal life
Marditsis was married since 1971 to his wife, Irene and together they had a daughter, Alexandra and a son, Nikos. Professionally, he worked as an aircraft engineer in the Air Force from where he retired in 1983. Ηe was also active in the field of tennis being one of the main contributors to the creation of the Papagou Tennis Club.

He faced problems of a cardiac nature and was hit intermittently by three strokes. The third proved to be fatal and Marditsis died on 26 January 2010, at the age of 76.

Honours

Egaleo
AFCA league: 1949–50, 1953–54

AEK Athens
Alpha Ethniki: 1962–63
Greek Cup: 1963–64

Greece military
World Military Cup: 1962

References

1933 births
2010 deaths
Egaleo F.C. players
AEK Athens F.C. players
Korinthos F.C. players
Footballers from Athens
Greek footballers
Association football defenders
People from Boeotia
Footballers from Central Greece